The Bryant H. and Lucie Barber House is a Registered Historic Place in the Ogle County, Illinois city of Polo. It is one of six overall sites and three homes in Polo listed on the Register. The other two homes listed on the National Register of Historic Places in Polo are the John McGrath House and the Henry D. Barber House.

Architecture
The Classical Revival Bryant H. and Lucie Barber House was designed by Joseph Lyman Silsbee. Constructed around 1901, the house has brick walls, a stone foundation and incorporates steel into its construction.

Significance
The Bryant H. and Lucie Barber House was listed on the National Register of Historic Places on February 10, 1993, for its significance in the area of architecture.

Notes

External links

National Register of Historic Places in Ogle County, Illinois
Houses in Ogle County, Illinois
Polo, Illinois
Houses on the National Register of Historic Places in Illinois